The 2004 New Zealand Music Awards was the 39th holding of the annual ceremony featuring awards for musical artists based in or originating from New Zealand. The awards were hosted by Jaquie Brown and Mikey Havoc at Aotea Centre on 22 September 2004. Eligible works were released between 1 January 2003 and 31 May 2004. The ceremony was screened on television channel C4 the following day.

Nominees and winners 

Three new categories were introduced in 2004: Best Rock Album, the People's Choice Award and Airplay Record of the Year.

Winners are listed first and highlighted in boldface.

Key
 – Non-technical award
 – Technical award

Presenters and performers

References 

New Zealand Music Awards, 2004
New Zealand Music Awards, 2004
Aotearoa Music Awards
September 2004 events in New Zealand